Josef Slíva (born November 25, 1898, date of death unknown) was a Czech figure skater who competed for Czechoslovakia in the 1924 Winter Olympics and in the 1928 Winter Olympics.

In 1924 he finished fourth in the singles event. Four years later he finished fifth in the singles competition at the St. Moritz Games.

Results

References

External links
 Profile

1898 births
Czech male single skaters
Czechoslovak male single skaters
Olympic figure skaters of Czechoslovakia
Figure skaters at the 1924 Winter Olympics
Figure skaters at the 1928 Winter Olympics
Sportspeople from Třinec
Year of death missing